Geoffrey Durham (born 22 July 1949) is a British comedy magician and actor who was known for many years as "the Great Soprendo".

Early life

Durham was born in East Molesey, Surrey, England. At the age of ten, he developed an interest in magic and performed occasional shows for friends and relatives. By the age of 13, however, that interest had waned. He later studied Spanish at Leeds University and then took a job as a stage-hand at the Leeds City Varieties Theatre. He worked there for 18 months, ending up as head flyman, and then left to become an actor.

After working in various stage shows for several years his interest in magic was rekindled while preparing for a show in Liverpool, in which his character performed some tricks. He dug out some of his old props and found he enjoyed learning and performing magic so much that he decided to make it his new career.

Magic career

Durham presented a magic act as an outrageous Spanish magician for at least 15 years before performing as himself. As 'The Great Soprendo', Durham appeared in many children's TV shows, including Crackerjack, and appeared in theatres all over the country.  His catchphrase was "Piff Paff Poof!"

After ditching his disguise as the Great Soprendo, Durham has had continued success in his own right. He was a regular contributor to the Channel 4 game show Countdown, and his Newspaper Tear featured on the 50 Greatest Magic Tricks on the same channel. He occasionally appeared as one of the Puzzle Panel on BBC Radio 4.

Durham acted as magic consultant on the Doctor Who story The Greatest Show in the Galaxy in 1988, coaching Sylvester McCoy in magic for the scenes in Part Four where the Doctor performs a magic show in the Dark Circus to appease the Gods of Ragnarok, for which he received an on-screen credit.

Durham is a member of the Inner Magic Circle, and was presented with the Maskelyne Award in 2002. Durham had previously refused to join the Magic Circle because membership was only open to men, and was instead a member of the International Brotherhood of Magicians.

Durham appeared in the 1987 film Wish You Were Here, which starred Emily Lloyd and Tom Bell.

Personal life
Durham married the writer and comedian Victoria Wood in March 1980, but they separated in October 2002 and were later divorced. The couple had a daughter, Grace, and a son, Henry. Durham remarried in December 2014.

In 1994, Durham went to a Quaker meeting and became a member of the Society of Friends two years later. He has described his life with Quakers as "the single most inspiring, moving and rewarding thread running through the whole of my adult life". He was involved for many years with the Quaker outreach programme Quaker Quest, and he remains a regular speaker at Quaker events. He has written The Spirit of the Quakers and Being a Quaker: A Guide for Newcomers, currently in its second edition.

References

External links
 Geoffrey Durham at the British Film Institute
 
 Interview with Durham

1949 births
Converts to Quakerism
English magicians
English Quakers
Living people
People from Molesey
Alumni of the University of Leeds